Michael Foster (born 5 March 1973) is an Australian former cricketer. He played seven first-class cricket matches for Victoria between 1995 and 1997.

See also
 List of Victoria first-class cricketers

References

External links
 

1973 births
Living people
Australian cricketers
Victoria cricketers
Cricketers from Melbourne